Ivan Čehok (born 13 September 1965) is a Croatian politician who served as mayor of Varaždin from 2001 to 2011, and is currently serving since 2017. He was a prominent member of the Croatian Social Liberal Party (HSLS). 

Čehok was born in Korenjak (part of Maruševec), in Varaždin County. He obtained a degree in philosophy and comparative literature from the Zagreb Faculty of Philosophy, and later also earned a PhD in philosophy from the same faculty. He wrote several philosophy and ethics high school textbooks.

Between 2004 and 2006, Čehok was president of the HSLS.

He was elected to the Croatian Parliament in 2000, 2003, and 2007 parliamentary elections. He left the Croatian Social Liberal Party in 2010.

In June 2011, Čehok was arrested and questioned by USKOK on criminal charges, after his parliamentary immunity was stripped by the Parliament.

In July 2011, while in custody, Čehok resigned as the mayor of Varaždin. In the same year, he went into retirement.

In the 2017 local election, Čehok was re-elected as the mayor of Varaždin.

In the 2021 local election, Čehok lost and took over the leadership of his independent list in The City Council of Varaždin.

References

1965 births
Living people
People from Maruševec
Croatian Social Liberal Party politicians
Representatives in the modern Croatian Parliament
Mayors of places in Croatia
Faculty of Humanities and Social Sciences, University of Zagreb alumni